Bradford Clark Lewis (born April 29, 1958) is an American film producer, animation director, and politician. He produced Antz, the Oscar-winning Ratatouille, and How to Train Your Dragon: The Hidden World.  He also co-directed Cars 2 and produced Storks. He is a former mayor of the city of San Carlos, California.

Personal life
Lewis was born in  Sacramento County, California. He was raised in San Mateo, California and moved to nearby San Carlos in 1991. Lewis graduated from Fresno State University with a Bachelor of Arts in Theatre, and lives in San Carlos, California. Brad has a son, Jackson Lewis, and a daughter Ella Dale Lewis.

Career

Pacific Data Images
Lewis worked at Pacific Data Images (PDI) for over thirteen years where he served as Vice President of Productions. He served as representing producer for PDI on films such as Forces of Nature, The Peacemaker and Broken Arrow. Lewis produced television specials such as Hanna-Barbera's The Last Halloween, for which he won an Emmy, and the first 3D episode of The Simpsons. He received a second Emmy for graphic design utilized on ABC's Monday Night Football. Additionally, Lewis' commercial production work netted him two Clios. He also served as producer on Antz. Lewis was to direct the cancelled animated film Tusker with Tim Johnson. Lewis left the company shortly after it was purchased by DreamWorks.

Pixar
Brad Lewis joined Pixar in November 2001; his first credit was on The Incredibles as an actor. He served as producer on Ratatouille in 2007 and later went on to co-direct Cars 2 in 2011. He co-directed the English voice version of Hayao Miyazaki's Ponyo in 2009.

Recent
Lewis left Pixar to join Digital Domain in 2011, at their Tradition Studios division in Florida where he was to direct animated features. After Digital Domain's bankruptcy filing and their shutdown and layoffs at Tradition Studios, Lewis joined Warner Bros. as a producer. He produced Storks which was released on September 23, 2016, and was executive producer on The Lego Batman Movie. Lewis returned to DreamWorks Animation to produce How to Train Your Dragon: The Hidden World.

Local politics
Lewis served five years on the San Carlos Parks & Recreation Commission before being elected to the city's council in 2005. He became vice-mayor in 2006, and mayor in 2007. He served in the San Carlos City Council in 2010.

Filmography

Feature films

Short Films and Television

Other Credits

References

External links

Brad Lewis' 2005 election website

1958 births
American film producers
American animated film directors
American animated film producers
California State University, Fresno alumni
DreamWorks Animation people
Film directors from California
Living people
People from San Carlos, California
American racing drivers
24 Hours of Daytona drivers
Rolex Sports Car Series drivers
Pixar people